Beverly Hills is an unincorporated community adjacent to the city of Fairmont in Marion County, West Virginia, United States.

References 

Unincorporated communities in Marion County, West Virginia
Unincorporated communities in West Virginia